Samuel Corral Valero (born 3 April 1992) is a Spanish professional footballer who most recently played for Polish club ŁKS Łódź as a forward.

Club career
Born in Granada, Corral joined the youth academy of CP Granada 74 in 2008. In 2010–11, he made his senior debut, representing Guadix CF in Primera Andaluza. In the following years, he went on to represent Granada CF B, Atarfe Industrial CF, UD Maracena, Loja CD and CD El Ejido in the Tercera División. He won promotion to Segunda División B with El Ejido during the 2015–16 season.

On 9 July 2019, Corral signed with CF Talavera de la Reina in Segunda B. On 4 January 2020, he moved abroad and joined Polish Ekstraklasa club ŁKS Łódź on a contract running until 30 June 2022.

Club statistics

References

External links

1992 births
Living people
Association football forwards
Spanish footballers
Segunda División B players
Tercera División players
Club Recreativo Granada players
Atarfe Industrial CF players
Loja CD players
CD El Ejido players
CF Talavera de la Reina players
Ekstraklasa players
I liga players
III liga players
ŁKS Łódź players
Spanish expatriate footballers
Expatriate footballers in Poland
Spanish expatriate sportspeople in Poland